The 2001 Governor General's Awards for Literary Merit were presented by Adrienne Clarkson, Governor General of Canada, at a ceremony at Rideau Hall on November 14. Each winner received a cheque for $15,000.

English-language finalists

Fiction
Richard B. Wright, Clara Callan
Yann Martel, Life of Pi
Tessa McWatt, Dragons Cry
Jane Urquhart, The Stone Carvers
Thomas Wharton, Salamander

Poetry
George Elliott Clarke, Execution Poems
Anne Carson, Men in the Off Hours
Phil Hall, Trouble Sleeping
Robert Kroetsch, The Hornbooks of Rita K.
Steve McCaffery, Seven Pages Missing

Drama
Kent Stetson, The Harps of God
Mark Brownell, Monsieur d'Eon
Clem Martini, A Three Martini Lunch
Michael Redhill, Building Jerusalem
Jason Sherman, An Acre of Time: The Play

Non-fiction
Thomas Homer-Dixon, The Ingenuity Gap
Susan Crean, The Laughing One: A Journey to Emily Carr
Ross A. Laird, Grain of Truth: The Ancient Lessons of Craft
Alberto Manguel, Reading Pictures: A History of Love and Hate
Jack Todd, The Taste of Metal: A Deserter's Story

Children's literature (text)
Arthur Slade, Dust
Brian Doyle, Mary Ann Alice
Beth Goobie, Before Wings
Julie Johnston, In Spite of Killer Bees
Teresa Toten, The Game

Children's literature (illustration)
Mireille Levert, An Island in the Soup
Harvey Chan, Wild Bog Tea
Murray Kimber, The Wolf of Gubbio
Kim LaFave, We'll All Go Sailing
Cindy Revell, Mallory and the Power Boy

French-to-English translation
Fred A. Reed and David Homel, Fairy Ring (Martine Desjardins, Le Cercle de Clara)
Sheila Fischman, The Little Girl Who Was Too Fond of Matches (Gaétan Soucy, La petite fille qui aimait trop les allumettes)
Gail Scott, The Sailor's Disquiet (Michael Delisle, Le Désarroi du matelot)

French-language finalists

Fiction
Andrée A. Michaud, 
Marie-Claire Blais, 
Rachel Leclerc,

Poetry
Paul Chanel Malenfant, 
Tania Langlais, 
Hélène Monette, 
Stefan Psenak, 
Jean-Philippe Raîche,

Drama
Normand Chaurette, 
François Archambault, 
Réjane Charpentier, 
Michel Ouellette, "Requiem", in

Non-fiction
Renée Dupuis, 
Jacques Allard, 
Michel Biron, 
Madeleine Gagnon, 
Jacques B. Gélinas,

Children's literature (text)
Christiane Duchesne, 
Cécile Gagnon, 
Ann Lamontagne, 
Marthe Pelletier, 
Jean-Michel Schembré,

Children's literature (illustration)
Bruce Roberts, 
Marjolaine Bonenfant, 
Pascale Constantin, 
Stéphane Poulin, 
Mylène Pratt, 

English-to-French translationMichel Saint-Germain, 'Agnès Guitard, Maryse Warda, ''

References 

Governor General's Awards
Governor General's Awards
Governor General's Awards